Khandaqlu may refer to:
 Khandaqlu, North Khorasan
 Khandaqlu, Zanjan